Subject to Change were an American rock music band formed in 1991 featuring the lead vocals and lyrics of actress and singer Cree Summer. The band was signed to the Capitol record label and recorded one album, Womb Amnesia. The album was a funk rock fusion album that reflected the popular grunge of the time. It featured intense feminist lyrics and spawned the song "Soul Sister," which would go on to be re-recorded by Lenny Kravitz and Summer for her 1999 solo debut album Street Faërie.  Due to major power shifts at the label, the album was only available in limited commercial release and never promoted. Only several thousand copies were ever sent out to the public, and they are considered collector's items.

Discography

Albums
Womb Amnesia (1993)

Rock music groups from California
Musical groups established in 1991
Musical groups from Los Angeles
Funk rock musical groups